The 1989–90 season was Sport Lisboa e Benfica's 86th season in existence and the club's 56th consecutive season in the top flight of Portuguese football, covering the period from 1 July 1989 to 30 June 1990. Benfica competed domestically in the Primeira Divisão, the Taça de Portugal and the Supertaça, and participated in the European Cup after winning the previous league.

After only winning the Primeira Divisão, Benfica disputed the Supertaça, winning it for the third time. The league campaign was another controversial battle with Porto, who finished four points ahead of Benfica. Magnusson won the Bola de Prata. With attentions set on the European Cup, Benfica reached the final after defeating Marseille in the semi-finals. In the seventh European Cup Final, Benfica lost for a fifth time, prolonging Guttmann's curse.

Season summary
The new season saw the arrival of Sven-Göran Eriksson for a second term. After Benfica won the 1988–89 Primeira Divisão on 7 May 1989, Eriksson confirmed that he would take over Toni's job only three days later. In the transfer window, Benfica lost Shéu and Mozer, with the first retiring and the latter moving abroad. To replace him, the club hired Brazilian defender Aldair and Swedish midfielder Jonas Thern. Eriksson started working on 28 July with Benfica travelling to Netherlands the following day for a two-week tour. They competed in the Rotterdam Tournament in early August and had their  presentation game against Spartak Moscow on the 15. They then won the Trofeo Cidade de Vigo and had a late friendly with Varzim, postponing the league opening game.

Benfica's league campaign was again a clash with Porto. The season was notable by the constant controversy surrounding referees and the battle for control of the Portuguese Football Federation. The crucial Clássico on 11 March 1990 ended with a draw, keeping Porto with a three-point lead, nearly closing the title race. Benfica was nonetheless, entirely focused on the European Cup, as Eriksson admitted that winning another European title was a target of President João Santos. Eriksson led the team through easy wins against Derry City and Budapest Honvéd. The quarter-final matches with Dnipro Dnipropetrovsk fell within a busy schedule, but despite that, Benfica flew past the Ukrainian with three-nil win.

However, the semi-finals with Marseille were much different. Benfica lost in France by 2–1; their first loss after seven games and needed a win to go through, as Erisskon said "We are not dead yet. He have a 49% chance of going through"  The home reception to Marseille saw 120 thousand fans fill Estádio da Luz to witness Vata score the sole goal that qualified Benfica. In the 83rd minute, in a corner, Vata rose above everyone and slipped the ball past Jean Castaneda with his hand. Several players immediately surrounded referee Marcel Van Langenhove protesting that the goal was scored with the hand, but he disregarded their appeals. Assistant manager Toni gave his opinion: "Vata was pulled and he could not fight for the ball – unable to use his chest or head, he used his hand. So what the referee should have done is signalled a penalty, which he did not do." Bernard Tapie furiously screamed "The Portuguese are pigs, they are pigs. They gave something to the referee, it could only be. Benfica still has a lot of power and scares a lot of people. This was a disgrace."

Benfica ended the league on 20 May, finishing four points behind Porto. Three days later, they met AC Milan in the European Cup Final in Vienna. Before the final, Eusébio visited Béla Guttmann's grave and prayed for his curse to be lifted. Dressed in white, Benfica was defeated with a goal from Rijkaard in the second half. Eriksson regretted the loss and explained his strategy: "It consisted of closely marking Gullit and van Basten, so they would be offside while simultaneously paying attention to the midfielders. I talked a lot about it and they executed it perfectly, until Rijkaard came from behind and stole our dream".

Still, Benfica did not ended the season empty handed, having previously won their third Supertaça Cândido de Oliveira against Belenenses. Magnusson was the league top-scorer with 33 goals.

Competitions

Overall record

Supertaça Cândido de Oliveira

Primeira Divisão

League table

Results by round

Matches

Taça de Portugal

European Cup

First round

Second round

Quarter-final

Semi-final

Final

Friendlies

Player statistics
The squad for the season consisted of the players listed in the tables below, as well as staff members Sven-Göran Eriksson (manager) and Toni (assistant manager), Eusébio (assistant manager), José Capristano (director of football), Shéu (Secretary of football department), Bernardo Vasconcelos (doctor), Amílcar Miranda (doctor), Asterónimo Araújo (masseur), António Gaspar (physiotherapist), Jorge Castelo (scout), Luís Santos (kit man), José Luís (kit man).

|}

Transfers

In

Out

Out by loan

References

Bibliography
 
 
 
 
 
 

S.L. Benfica seasons
Benfica